Baao station is a former railway station located on the South Main Line in Camarines Sur, Philippines.

Structure
Like other abandoned stations of PNR, the only remains of the station was the platform itself, the station building is gone.

Philippine National Railways stations
Railway stations in Camarines Sur
Defunct railway stations
Railway stations opened in 1915